The Island of Love (French: L'île d'amour) is a 1944 French drama film directed by Maurice Cam and starring Tino Rossi, Édouard Delmont and Josseline Gaël. A Corsican fisherman becomes ensnared by a sophisticated woman and follows her to Paris.

Cast

Reception
It was one of the most popular movies in France in 1945 with admissions of 3,142,290.

References

Bibliography
 Rège, Philippe. Encyclopedia of French Film Directors, Volume 1. Scarecrow Press, 2009.

External links 

1944 films
French drama films
Films directed by Maurice Cam
Films set in Corsica
Films set in Paris
French black-and-white films
1944 drama films
1940s English-language films
1940s French films